The former Sun Yat-sen University of Medical Sciences (SUMS) was located in Yuexiu District, Guangzhou, Guangdong, China. It is government run university which originated from Boji Medical College, which was established in 1886 in part as a result of the Canton Hospital. The Kung Yee Medical School and Hospital was merged into it in 1925. Dr. Sun Yat-sen once studied and worked in Boji.

This university was a national key medical university. In 2001, the university merged with Sun Yat-sen University and became the Sun Yat-sen College of Medical Science.

References

External links
 

Sun Yat-sen University
Medical schools in China
Educational institutions established in 1886
1886 establishments in China
Educational institutions disestablished in 2001
2001 disestablishments in China
Defunct universities and colleges in China